Philippe Baillet (6 October 1940 – 5 January 2015) was a French basketball player. He competed in the men's tournament at the 1960 Summer Olympics.

References

1940 births
2015 deaths
French men's basketball players
Olympic basketball players of France
Basketball players at the 1960 Summer Olympics
Sportspeople from Bordeaux